Bury Me in My Boots is the second studio album by American country rock band The Cadillac Three. It was released on August 5, 2016 via Big Machine Records. The album includes the singles "The South", "Party Like You", and "White Lightning".

Critical reception
Stephen Thomas Erlewine criticized the more novelty-driven numbers and occasional influence of bro-country, but praised the band's Southern rock influences.

Track listing

Personnel
From Bury Me in My Boots liner notes and backing card.
The Cadillac Three
Kelby Ray Caldwell - background vocals, bass guitar, lap steel guitar
Jaren Johnston - lead vocals, guitar; banjo (track 9), ganjo (track 4), keyboards (track 4), programming (track 4)
Neil Mason - drums, percussion

Additional musicians
Dierks Bentley - background vocals (track 10)
Mike Eli - background vocals (track 10)
Florida Georgia Line - background vocals (track 10)
Ryan Gore - programming (track 4)
Dann Huff - electric guitar (track 10), bouzouki (track 10)

Technical
Drew Bollman - recording (tracks 1, 5, 6, 7, 8, 10)
The Cadillac Three - producer (tracks 2, 4, 7, 11, 12, 13)
Ryan Gore - recording (tracks 2, 4, 7, 11, 12, 13), mixing (tracks 12, 13)
Mark Hagen - recording (track 3)
Dann Huff - producer (tracks 1, 3, 5, 6, 8, 9, 10, 14)
Andrew Mendelson - mastering
Seth Morton - recording (tracks 1, 5, 6, 7, 8, 10)
Sean Neff - digital editing (10)
Justin Niebank - producer (tracks 1, 3, 5, 6, 8, 9, 10, 14), recording (1, 5, 6, 7, 8, 10, 14), mixing (all tracks except 12 and 13)
Jarod Snowden - digital editing (track 4)

Charts
Album

Singles

References

2016 albums
The Cadillac Three albums
Big Machine Records albums
Albums produced by Dann Huff